Liwa Fatemiyoun (Persian/Dari:  or ), literally "Fatimid Banner", also known as Fatemiyoun Division or Fatemiyoun Brigade, is an Afghan Shia militia formed in 2014 to fight in Syria on the side of the Syrian government. The group's officially designated purpose, is the defense of the shrine of Zaynab bint Ali, and to fight "takfiri terrorists" in Syria, which would come to include the Islamic State (IS). It is funded, trained, and equipped by the Islamic Revolutionary Guard Corps (IRGC), and fights under the command of Iranian officers. Both the Fatemiyoun Brigade and the Iranian government downplay their relationship with one another, despite clear coordination and the brigade's operation under the auspices of the IRGC. Liwa Fatemiyoun is also closely associated with Hezbollah Afghanistan.

By late 2017, the unit was presumed to have numbered between 10,000–20,000 fighters. According to Zohair Mojahed, a cultural official in the Fatemiyoun Brigade, the group suffered 2,000 killed and 8,000 wounded up to the end of 2017 while fighting in Syria. However, other non-brigade sources have put the number of combat deaths lower.

History

Background 

The core of Liwa Fatemiyoun is constituted of the fighters of the Shia militia group Muhammad Army which was active during the Soviet–Afghan War and against the Taliban, until its collapse after the Invasion of Afghanistan, as well as the Abuzar Brigade, an all-Afghan Shia militia group who voluntarily fought in the Iran–Iraq War. During the Iran–Iraq war, these fighters were stationed in the mountainous areas of Loolan and Navcheh in the northwestern Iran, as they had experience in mountain warfare and irregular warfare during the war against the Soviets.

Iran is also known to have established branches of Hezbollah in Afghanistan and Pakistan, with several pro-Iranian groups operating in both countries by the Soviet–Afghan War.

Operations of Liwa Fatemiyoun 
Reports of pro-government Afghan fighters in Syria date back to October 2012. They originally fought in the Iraqi Abu Fadl al-Abbas Brigade before eventually becoming a distinct brigade in 2013. According to news sources affiliated with the IRGC, the group was founded on 22 Urdibihist 1392/12 May 2013. The group's officially designated purpose, according to the Iranian government and affiliated news sources, is the defense of the shrine of Zaynab bint Ali, the granddaughter of Prophet Muhammad, and to fight "takfiri terrorists" in Syria, which would come to include the Islamic State (IS).  At some point before 2014, Liwa Fatemiyoun was "incorporated" with Hezbollah Afghanistan, a minor political party in Afghanistan.

The Liwa Fatemiyoun became involved in multiple operations throughout Syria, including in Darra, Aleppo, and Palmyra. In March 2016, they fought in the recapture of Palmyra from the Islamic State. In 2017, the unit helped countering a major rebel offensive in northern Hama Governorate, and later aided a pro-government offensive in the Syrian Desert that aimed at reaching the Iraqi border. In course of the latter campaign, Mohammad Hosseini (also known as "Salman") was killed as he stepped on an anti-personnel mine. Hosseini had served as the intelligence chief of Liwa Fatemiyoun's Hazrat-e Fatemeh Zahra Brigade. Following the successful conclusion of this offensive, the Liwa Fatemiyoun took part in the campaign to capture all of central Syria from the IS. Anwar Yawri, another commander of Liwa Fatemiyoun, was killed during these operations. The unit later took part in the Eastern Syria campaign (September–December 2017), and helped to break the Islamic State's siege on Deir ez-Zor.

Throughout their operations in Syria, Liwa Fatemiyoun has sustained numerous casualties. In October 2014, three fighters were captured by the rebel Islamic Front. Their fates are unknown. On 7 May 2015, Iran commemorated 49 fighters of the group who were killed. According to Spiegel Online, 700 members of the group are believed to have been killed in combat around Daraa and Aleppo as of June 2015. 

The Washington Institute estimated at least 255 casualties between January 19, 2012 and March 8, 2016. While precise casualty figures are difficult to determine, the brigade is thought to have lost 925 fighters in Syria as of May 2020. These numbers are likely to increase as the Iranian government continues to identify the remains of Fatemiyoun members, sometimes as long as 5 years after their death, and return their bodies to Iran.  

On 21 November 2017, Iran declared victory over IS, and subsequently started to downsize Liwa Fatemiyoun. The first troops to be demobilized were the youngest and oldest, as well as those who had exhibited problematic behavior such as indiscipline. The demobilized fighters were sent back to Iran to return to their families and civilian life. 

In the course of the COVID-19 pandemic, Liwa Fatemiyoun reportedly began to produce masks and gloves in Iran and Syria, intending to distribute them to poor Syrians. Western observers suspected that this was supposed to boost the group's image and help it in recruiting new members. By late 2020, Liwa Fatemiyoun was still operating in eastern Syria, though only about 500 to 1,500 fighters strong.

Experts differ on what role Liwa Fatemiyoun was fulfilling as of 2020, as the Syrian government had become relatively secure. Researcher Phillip Smyth argued that Liwa Fatemiyoun was supposed to act as Iran's "phantom force" of trained foreign soldiers, ready to be used for possible future interventions. Accordingly, Symth and ex-Herat Province governor Abdul Qayoum Rahim claimed in 2020 that Liwa Fatemiyoun had begun deployment to other localities around the Middle East without providing firm evidence.

Symth and Rahim also claimed that the constant fighting had turned Liwa Fatemiyoun into an elite force, as most of its less capable fighters had been killed or demobilized, leaving only the most experienced and radical ones. Other security analysts argued that there was no evidence for further mass foreign deployments, and that Liwa Fatemiyoun was overall diminishing in numbers and suffering from low morale, as the Iranian government had proven to be slow in granting promised benefits to its fighters.

Organization, supplies and equipment

Liwa Fatemiyoun is led by IRGC commanders and supplied by the Iranian military. Its troops are recruited from the approximately 3 million Afghans in Iran, as well as Afghan refugees already residing in Syria. The recruits are typically Hazara, an ethnic group from central Afghanistan. The Iranian recruiters for Liwa Fatemiyoun are usually members of the Basij. In August 2016, Iranian official Qurban Ghalambor was arrested by the Afghan government for recruiting fighters for the brigade.

The Afghans are promised Iranian citizenship and salaries of $500–$800 per month in return for fighting (usually a 3-month-long deployment to Syria). Many are refugees and some criminals who choose recruitment over imprisonment or deportation, though the Iranian government generally claims that they are religiously motivated volunteers. The first Liwa Fatemiyoun troops sent to Syria were told that they were fulfilling their "Islamic duty" by defending the shrines of Damascus. 

After completing their service, many ex-Liwa Fatemiyoun fighters were frustrated that the Iranian government proved slow in fulfilling all their demands. Most importantly, fighters struggled to secure the promised benefits such as salaries, housing, and jobs due to Iran's difficult economic situation and cases of Iranian officials stalling in regards to payouts. The families of fallen fighters have also struggled to secure benefits and visas.

Though some Afghan sub-commanders of Liwa Fatemiyoun are veterans of several wars, including the Iran–Iraq War and the Afghan Civil War (1996–2001), new recruits of the unit generally lack combat experience. The recruits are given just a few weeks of training, armed, and flown to Syria via the Iraq–Syria–Iran air bridge. These soldiers are used as shock troopers, spearheading numerous important pro-government offensives alongside Iranian, Iraqi, and Hezbollah troops. Most of them operate as light infantry, although some receive more thorough training and can work as tank crews. 

Parts of Liwa Fatemiyoun have been trained by the Russian Armed Forces. As the unit is often used in those war zones where the most intense fighting takes place despite its sometimes inadequate training, observers believe that Liwa Fatemiyoun fighters often act as "cannon fodder". By 2020, analysts such as Philip Symth argued that the "cannon fodder" troops of the unit had been mostly weeded out, leaving only a hardened core of fighters.

Relationship with Hezbollah Afghanistan 

According to researcher Phillip Smyth, Liwa Fatemiyoun and Hezbollah Afghanistan were originally different groups, but showed such great overlap in ideology and membership by 2014 that they had become "incorporated". In contrast, researcher Oved Lobel continued to regard Liwa Fatemiyoun and Hezbollah Afghanistan as separate organizations in 2018, though both were part of Iran's "regional proxy network". Other sources such as Jihad Intel and Arab News have treated the two as the same organization. Researcher Michael Robillard called Liwa Fatemiyoun a "branch of Hezbollah Afghanistan".

Accusations of war crimes 
According to Human Rights Watch, Liwa Fatemiyoun has recruited child soldiers, some of whom were as young as 14.

Designation as terrorist organization 
In 2019, the United States and Canada each declared the Fatemiyoun a terrorist organization. According to then Treasury Secretary Steven Mnuchin, the designation of the Fatemiyoun as a terrorist organization was part of an "ongoing pressure campaign to shut down the illicit networks the [Iranian] regime uses to export terrorism and unrest across the globe.”

See also

 List of armed groups in the Syrian Civil War
 Liwa Zainebiyoun
 Holy Shrine Defender

References

Bibliography

Further reading 
 Understanding the Fatemiyoun Division: Life Through the Eyes of a Militia Member

Organizations of the Yemeni Crisis (2011–present)
Pro-government factions of the Syrian civil war
Shia Islamist groups
Organizations based in Syria
Organizations designated as terrorist by Canada
Jihadist groups in Syria
Axis of Resistance
Organizations designated as terrorist by the United States
Organizations designated as terrorist by Saudi Arabia